91 athletes (74 male and 17 female) represented Lebanon at the 1975 7th Mediterranean games in Algeria. Lebanon won 3 gold medals and 2 bronze in these games; Mohamed Tarabulsi gave Lebanon its 3 gold medals thanks to his clean sweep of the 75 kg weightlifting snatch, jerk and total.

Medal table

Lebanese medals by sport

Lebanese Medal winners

Medalists

References

Nations at the 1975 Mediterranean Games
Lebanon at the Mediterranean Games
1975 in Lebanese sport